Mick Higgins (9 August 1911 – 6 September 1989) was  a former Australian rules footballer who played with Footscray in the Victorian Football League (VFL).

Notes

External links 
		

1911 births
1989 deaths
Australian rules footballers from Victoria (Australia)
Western Bulldogs players